Phaiogramma is a genus of moths in the family Geometridae erected by Carl Freiherr von Gumppenberg in 1887. Markku Savela gives this name as a synonym of Chlorissa Stephens, 1831.

Species
Species include:
 Phaiogramma discessa (Walker, 1861)
 Phaiogramma etruscaria (Zeller, 1849)
 Phaiogramma faustinata (Milliere, 1868)
 P. faustinata hintzi (Strand, 1915)
 P. faustinata vermiculata (Warren, 1897)
 Phaiogramma stibolepida (Butler, 1879)

References

Geometridae